A fortnight is a period of 14 days or alternatively half of a month.

Fortnight or Fortnightly may also refer to:
Fort Nightly, a 2007 album by White Rabbits
Fortnight (magazine), an Irish magazine published from 1970 to 2012
The Fortnightly Review, an English magazine published from 1865 to 1954

See also
Fortnite, a 2017 video game
14 Days (disambiguation)
Two weeks (disambiguation)